Brighton & Hove Albion F.C., an English association football club based in the city of Brighton & Hove, East Sussex, was founded in 1901. Its first team entered the Southern League and the FA Cup in 1901–02, and in 1920–21 were founder members of the Football League Third Division, which became the Third Division South the following year. They spent four seasons in the First Division in the early 1980s, but soon returned to the lower divisions. In 1997, the club lost its ground and the team nearly dropped out of the League. Twenty years later, they were promoted to the Premier League.

The club's first team have competed in numerous nationally and regionally organised competitions, and all players who have played in 100 or more such matches, either as a member of the starting eleven or as a substitute, are listed below. Each player's details include the duration of his Albion career, his typical playing position while with the club, and the number of matches played and goals scored in domestic league matches and in all senior competitive matches. Where applicable, the list also includes the national team(s) for which the player was selected, and the number of senior international caps he won while an Albion player.

Introduction

Of the nearly 200 men who made 100 or more appearances in first-team competition for Brighton & Hove Albion, Tug Wilson has 75 more appearances than the next contender. He came into the team in 1922, and over the next 12 seasons averaged around 44 competitive matches a season, taking his total to 566 by the time he retired in 1936. Tommy Cook tops the club's all-time scorers list, with 123 goals from 209 peacetime matches. Kit Napier's 99 remained a post-Second World War record for nearly 50 years, until Glenn Murray scored his 100th Albion goal in October 2018. Arthur Attwood's club record of 35 goals scored in a single season stood for 45 years, until Peter Ward went one better in 1976–77 to set a mark that still stands. Eric Gill set the club record for consecutive appearances with 247 in the mid-1950s.

Charlie Webb became the first man to be capped for his country while a Brighton & Hove Albion player when he represented Ireland against Scotland in the 1908–09 British Home Championship. Albion's first England international was Tommy Cook, who played against Wales in 1925; Billy Booth was selected as travelling reserve in 1913, but his services were not needed. The man with most caps for his country while an Albion player is Shane Duffy for Republic of Ireland with 30; he overtook the previous record of 17, held jointly by Gerry Ryan and Steve Penney, in October 2018. Peter Harburn was inadvertently named in the Great Britain squad preparing for the 1956 Olympics, for which, as a professional, he was ineligible.

Six men listed hereWebb, Cook, Chris Cattlin, Jimmy Case, Brian Horton and Dean Wilkinswent on to manage the club, while Joe Wilson, Glen Wilson and Nathan Jones had spells as caretaker manager.

Other players took part in significant matches in the history of the club. Eight men listed here were on the winning side in the 1910 FA Charity Shield match, in which Albion as Southern League champions faced 1909–10 Football League champions Aston Villa. Charlie Webb scored the only goal of the match to secure what, remains the club's only major national trophy, and Billy Booth, Bill Hastings, Bullet Jones, Joe Leeming, Bert Longstaff, Joe McGhie and Bob Whiting also played. Five of the team that contested Albion's first Football League fixture in 1920George Coomber, Billy Hayes, Wally Little, Longstaff and Jack Woodhouseare listed here, as are nine of the twelve who faced Manchester United in the 1983 FA Cup Final. The scores were level at 2–2, with goals from Gordon Smith and Gary Stevens, until the last moments of extra time, when Smith had a clear chance to score a winning goal. Peter Jones's radio commentary became famous: "and Smith  score...", he cried, just before the shot was blocked by the goalkeeper's legs. Albion lost the replay 4–0, and were relegated that same season.

Stuart Tuck, Jeff Minton, Gary Hobson, Stuart Storer, Kerry Mayo and Ross Johnson played, and Nicky Rust was an unused substitute, in the match against Hereford United in May 1997 that maintained Albion's Football League status at their opponents' expense. Less than twenty years later, Albion made their debut in the Premier League, in a 2–0 defeat at home to Manchester City: eleven of the fourteen who took the field that day made more than 100 appearances for the club.

Many Albion players served their country in times of war. Bob Whiting and Arthur Hulme were killed in action during the First World War, while Tommy Allsopp died from influenza contracted on his way home from France after the war ended.

Key

The list is ordered first by number of appearances in total, then by number of League appearances, and then if necessary by date of debut.
Appearances as a substitute are included.
All statistics, both in prose and table, are correct up to and including 1 July 2022, the start of the 2022–23 season. Where a player left the club permanently after this date, his statistics are updated to his date of leaving.

Players with 100 or more appearances

Notes

Player statistics include matches played while on loan from:

References

Sources
 
 
 
 
 
 
 
 
 
 
 
 

Brighton & Hove Albion F.C.
 
Brighton and Hove Albion
Albion players
Association football player non-biographical articles